Arthur Jay Moss (June 21, 1931 – February 14, 2018) was an American cardiologist.

Early life and education
Moss was born June 21, 1931 and attended Yale University graduating in 1953 with a degree in psychology. He then attended Harvard Medical School and graduated in 1957. After completing his internship at Massachusetts General Hospital, he then served in the United States Navy. In 1961, he joined the University of Rochester Medical School where he completed his training in cardiology in 1966.

While in the Navy, he was the physician involved in the Holter monitoring and interpretations of the astronaut monkey, Miss Baker, one of the first animals launched into space, after the successful flight and landing of a Jupiter rocket; subsequently, he did the same with the first human astronaut.

Career
Moss joined the University of Rochester Medical School faculty in 1966, and became known for his research on long QT syndrome. Moss was later named the Bradford C. Berk, M.D., Ph.D. Distinguished Professor in Cardiology at Rochester, serving until his death in Brighton, Monroe County, New York on February 14, 2018, aged 86.

Honors
 Glorney-Raisbeck Award in Cardiology, New York Academy of Medicine, 2008
 Golden Lionel Award, Venice International Cardiac Arrhythmias Meeting, 2009
 Distinguished Scientist Award, Heart Rhythm Society, 2011
 University of Rochester's Eastman Medal, 2012
 Pioneer in Cardiac Pacing and EP Award, Heart Rhythm Society, 2017
 James B. Herrick Award, American Heart Association’s Scientific Sessions', 2017

Selected bibliography

References

1931 births
2018 deaths
American cardiologists
Yale University alumni
Harvard Medical School alumni
University of Rochester faculty